Marcel Schlosser (born 8 August 1987) is a German footballer who plays for VfB Auerbach.

External links

1987 births
Living people
German footballers
Chemnitzer FC players
FC Carl Zeiss Jena players
1. FC Magdeburg players
3. Liga players
Regionalliga players
Association football midfielders